The 2019 Solihull Metropolitan Borough Council election took place on 2 May 2019 to elect members of Solihull Metropolitan Borough Council in England. This was on the same day as other local elections.

Results summary

Ward results

Bickenhill

Blythe

Castle Bromwich

Chelmsley Wood

Dorridge & Hockley Heath

Elmdon

Kingshurst & Fordbridge

Knowle

Lyndon

Meriden

Olton

Shirley East

Shirley South

Shirley West

Silhill

Smith's Wood

St. Alphege

References

2019 English local elections
2019
2010s in the West Midlands (county)